Platypharodon extremus is a species of cyprinid fish endemic to the upper Yellow River basin in the Qinghai–Tibet Plateau of China. It is the only member of its genus, but is related to other schizothoracines (snowtrout and allies) like Aspiorhynchus, Chuanchia, Gymnocypris, Oxygymnocypris, Ptychobarbus, Schizopyge, Schizopygopsis and Schizothorax.

Similar to Schizopygopsis, P. extremus has a horny sheath on the lower jaw and spoon-shaped teeth that it uses to scrape off periphyton and algae from stones, but it will also eat benthic invertebrates.

An important food fish, P. extremus has seriously declined and is now listed as vulnerable on China's Red List. The species has been bred and raised in captivity, and individuals are released back into the wild from two purposely built stations in an attempt of countering its threatened status.

References

Cyprinid fish of Asia
Freshwater fish of China
Endemic fauna of China
Taxa named by Solomon Herzenstein
Fish described in 1891